Tombili (Turkish for chubby) (birthplace and date unknown, died August 1, 2016 in Istanbul) was a street cat from Istanbul. She was internationally known because of a photograph that shows her reclining on the pavement. The city of Istanbul honored Tombili after her death with a statue.

Life 
Tombili (a common Turkish nickname for a chubby pet) was a street cat who lived in Ziverbey in the Kadıköy district of Istanbul. The cat became popular with residents of the neighborhood for her friendliness and her way of leaning against steps. As a result of a photo of this pose, the cat became known worldwide in social networks and became an internet phenomenon. In the district of Kadıköy, she gained cult status. In 2016, Tombili fell seriously ill and eventually died in early August.

Monument 
After her death, a petition to honor her memory received 17,000 signatures and Kadıköy Mayor Aykurt Nuhoğlu agreed to officially commemorate her life. A local sculptor, Seval Şahin, made a sculpture recreating the pose which had gained her fame, which was inaugurated for World Wildlife Day on October 4, 2016. Hundreds of people came to pay their respects, and Kadıköy deputy mayor Başar Necipoğlu spoke at the event, which was carried on Turkish TV.

Theft and return 
A month later, the sculpture went missing. A photo shared on social media showed the statue missing from its place, leaving behind only the sculpture's brass plaque. Kadıköy Municipality announced on November 8, 2016 that the statue had been stolen, prompting outcry and concern both in Turkey and elsewhere. "They stole the Tombili statue. They are enemies of everything beautiful. All they know is hate, tears and war," Turkish MP Tuncay Özkan was quoted as saying in translation. However, on November 10, 2016, the statue was safely returned.

References

External links 
 "BoRa KiLiC Travel In Turkey - In Memory Of Istanbul’s Phenomenal Cat", on YouTube

Individual cats
2016 animal deaths
Istanbul
Feral cats